Elaterini is a tribe of click beetles in the family Elateridae. There are about 7 genera and 17 described species in Elaterini.

Genera
These seven genera belong to the tribe Elaterini:
 Diplostethus Schwarz, 1907 b
 Dolerosomus Motschulsky, 1859 g b
 Elater Linnaeus, 1758 b
 Mulsanteus Gozis, 1875 g b (brown wireworms)
 Orthostethus Lacordaire, 1857 g b
 Parallelostethus Schwarz, 1907 g b
 Sericus Eschscholtz, 1829 g b
Data sources: i = ITIS, c = Catalogue of Life, g = GBIF, b = Bugguide.net

References

Further reading

External links

 

Elateridae